Hangzhou No. 4 High School is a public, co-educational, high school in Hangzhou, Zhejiang, China. It was established in 1899 by Lin Qi as one of the earliest-founded public high schools in Hangzhou.

Notable alumni 
Chen Shutong(), politician, representative to the National Assembly, chairman of the Commercial Press and The National Commercial Bank, and vice-chairman of both the National People's Congress and the Chinese People's Political Consultative Conference.
Ma Xulun(), politician, activist, and linguist, one of the co-founders of the China Association for Promoting Democracy, early member of the Tongmenghui, professor at Peking University, director of education of Zhejiang Province, Minister of Education in 1949 and Minister of Higher Education in 1952, vice-president of the 4th Chinese People's Political Consultative Conference, and academician of Chinese Academy of Sciences.
Jiang Menglin(), educator, writer, and politician, President of Peking University and Zhejiang University, head of the Sino-American Joint Commission on Rural Reconstruction, Minister of Education and General Secretary of Executive Yuan.
Jin Yong() GMB OBE, novelist and essayist who co-founded the Hong Kong daily newspaper Ming Pao.
Li Linsi(), educator, diplomat and scholar, diplomatic consultant to Chiang Kai-shek, co-founder of the China branch of the United Nations and China Institute of World Cultural Cooperation at the League of Nations.
Lin Shu(), scholar, most famous for his introducing Western literature to a whole generation of Chinese readers.
Pan Tianshou(), artist, director and professor of China Academy of Art.
Qian Jiazhi(), educator.
Wu Fuzhi(), artist, professor of China Academy of Art. 
Shen Yinmo(), poet and calligrapher.
Yu Dafu(), writer and poet.
Xu Zhimo(), writer and poet.

References

External links 
 

Education in Hangzhou
High schools in Zhejiang